Art Mardigian (February 12, 1923 - June 6, 1977), better known as Art Mardigan, was an American jazz drummer.

Mardigan played with Tommy Reynolds in 1942 and served in the Army in 1943-44. After his discharge he worked extensively on the New York City jazz scene, playing and recording with Georgie Auld, Charlie Parker, Allen Eager, Dexter Gordon, Kai Winding, Wardell Gray, and Fats Navarro.

In 1948, he was hired by Phil Hill to join his bebop trio, with Abe Woodly on vibraphone, as the first house band at Detroit's Blue Bird Inn jazz club. The following year, Hill and Mardigan were joined by Wardell Gray, James “Beans” Richardson on bass  and Jack Tiant on bongos, and, as the Phil Hill Quintet, recorded a live album on July 20, 1949. The following April, the Wardell Gray Quartet, with Hill, Richardson and Mardigan recorded for Prestige.

In the 1950s he toured with Woody Herman and Pete Rugolo; he recorded as a leader of a sextet which included Al Cohn in 1954 for The Jazz School. He recorded with Stan Getz in 1954 and then moved back to his birthplace of Detroit. There he played with Jack Brokensha in 1963 and also worked at the Roostertail nightclub in the Johnny Trudell band, and returned to work with Getz near the end of his life.

Discography
 Georgie Auld, Handicap (Musicraft, 1990)
 Eddie Bert, Kaleidoscope (Savoy, 1987)
 Jack Brokensha, And Then I Said (Savoy, 1963)
 Chris Connor, Sings Lullabys of Birdland (Bethlehem, 1956)
 Bill DeArango & Art Mardigan, Renditions (Emarcy, 1987)
 Stan Getz, At The Shrine (Norgran, 1955)
 Jimmy Giuffre, Bob Cooper, Harry Klee, Bob Enevoldsen, Marty Paich, Tenors West (GNP, 1956)
 Woody Herman, Hey! Heard the Herd? (Verve, 1963)
 Woody Herman, The Third Herd Vol. 1 (Discovery, 1981)
 Pete Jolly, Duo, Trio, Quartet (RCA Victor, 1955)
 Jimmy Raney, A (Prestige, 1958)
 Jimmy Rowles, Rare But Well Done (Liberty, 1954)
 Clark Terry, Paul Gonsalves, Joe Gordon, Art Mardigan, The Jazz School (Wing, 1955)
 Nick Travis, The Panic Is On (RCA Victor, 1954)

References

Sources
Leonard Feather and Ira Gitler, The Biographical Encyclopedia of Jazz. Oxford, 1999, p.434

1923 births
1977 deaths
American jazz drummers
Jazz musicians from Michigan
20th-century American drummers
American male drummers
20th-century American male musicians
American male jazz musicians
EmArcy Records artists